Teofipol is an urban-type settlement in Khmelnytskyi Raion, Khmelnytskyi Oblast of western Ukraine. It hosts the administration of Teofipol settlement hromada, one of the hromadas of Ukraine. The settlement's population was 7,026 at the 2001 Ukrainian Census and 

Until 18 July 2020, Teofipol was the administrative center of Teofipol Raion. The raion was abolished in July 2020 as part of the administrative reform of Ukraine, which reduced the number of raions of Khmelnytskyi Oblast to three. The area of Teofipol Raion was merged into Khmelnytskyi Raion.

People from Teofipol
 Pavlo Khudzik, football striker for FC Zorya Luhansk
 Serhiy Shevchuk, football striker for FC Dynamo-2 Kyiv
 Art Shryer (born 1883), American klezmer musician

References

Urban-type settlements in Khmelnytskyi Raion
Volhynian Governorate
Populated places established in the 1420s
Historic Jewish communities in Ukraine